The Never Ending Tour is the popular name for Bob Dylan's endless touring schedule since June 7, 1988.

Tour
The 2003 tour started with eleven concerts in Oceania, seven being in Australia and four being in New Zealand. The concert in Melbourne on February 8 was part of the 'Melbourne International Music & Blues Festival'. The concert in Perth was part of the 'Moonlight, Music & Wine Festival'.  This leg of the tour came to an end twenty one days after the first concert on February 26. There were originally plans to continue this tour into Japan but these plans were abandoned.

Dylan then went on to tour the Central and Western United States, starting on April 18 in Dallas. Dylan performed two shows at the New Orleans Jazz & Heritage Festival on April 25 & 26. Then on May 2 Dylan and his band performed at the '10th Annual Music Midtown Festival'. Two days later he performed at 'SunFest 2003' in West Palm Beach, Florida and then later on in the month on May 17 he performed at the '2003 Jubilee! Jam'.

After finishing the spring tour Dylan returned to the road in mid-July to perform another tour of the United States. The tour started on July 12 at Winter Park, Colorado with a performance at the 'Winter Park Festival 2003'. Dylan opened for The Dead in Sunrise, Florida on July 29. Dylan continued to open for The Dead until August 8. Then he performed two double bill concerts with Tom Petty and the Heartbreakers on August 9 & 10. Dylan then completed the rest of the tour with just himself and his band.

On October 9 Dylan embarked on a thirty-three date European tour covering fifteen countries and twenty-nine cities. The tour came to an end in London, England at the Brixton Academy. He had also performed in London the previous two nights at the Shepherd's Bush Empire and the Hammersmith Apollo.

Tour dates

Cancelled shows

Notes

References

External links

BobLinks – Comprehensive log of concerts and set lists
Bjorner's Still on the Road – Information on recording sessions and performances

Bob Dylan concert tours
2003 concert tours